Vitaliy Bayrak (Alternative Spelling: Vitalii Bairak, Vitalij Bajrak, Volodomyr Bairak) was a Ukrainian Catholic priest and martyr. He was born on February 24, 1907, in Shvaikivtsi within the Ternopil Region of Ukraine. In 1924, he entered the Basilian monastery and would later be ordained a priest on August 13, 1933. He was appointed superior at the Drohobych monastery on in place of Joachim Senkivskyi.
 Throughout his life, he was considered to be a very active and friendly missionary, who possessed a great gift for giving spiritual direction.  
On September 17, 1945, Fr Vitaliy was arrested and on November 13 he was sentenced to imprisonment for confiscating property, even though he had none. On Easter 1946, he died a martyr for the faith after having beaten in the Drohobych prison.

References

1907 births
1946 deaths
20th-century Ukrainian people
People from Ternopil Oblast
Ukrainian Austro-Hungarians
Ukrainian people who died in Soviet detention
Eastern Catholic priests
Order of Saint Basil the Great
Ukrainian anti-communists
20th-century Eastern Catholic martyrs
Ukrainian beatified people
Eastern Catholic beatified people